Allan Ganter (born 18 June 1938) is a former Australian figure skater who competed at the 1956 Winter Olympics. He scored 132.41 points and finished 13th out of 16 competitors in the men's individual event.

Results

References

Sources

External links
 
 
 

1938 births
Living people
Australian male single skaters
Olympic figure skaters of Australia
Figure skaters at the 1956 Winter Olympics